Taluqdars or Talukdar (Hindustani: Devanagari:  ; Perso-Arabic: , ; from taluq "estate/attachment" + dar "owner"), were aristocrats who formed the ruling class during the Delhi Sultanate, Bengal Sultanate, Mughal Empire and British Raj. They were owners of a vast amount of lands, consistently hereditary, and were responsible for collecting taxes. The Taluqdars played helpful roles in the progression of Indian architecture and Indian economy during the reign of Emperor Shah Jahan and Aurangzeb, particularly in Bengal Subah, the most economically developed province in South Asia.

Being powerful peers, similar to those of Europe in the Middle Ages, after the decline of the Mughal state the Taluqdaris were to withstand the revenue collectors of the Colonial Powers while also bringing given number of villages under their dominion, and thus, according to many historians, the rapid development and enhancing power and wealth of the Taluqdaris during the early 19th century caused tremendous difficulties and concerns to the British East India Company. The majority of the Taluqdaris constructed themselves enormous mud fortified towers throughout tropical forests and maintained immense bodies of armed affinities.

The Taluqdars of Oudh were baronial, with some representing the ancient families. In other cases, the historical equivalent in Britain is similar to a member of the landed aristocracy, or perhaps a Lord of the Manor. In contemporary usage, the term is often regarded as a noble tribe and clan, although it may convey some diverse meanings in different parts of the Indian subcontinent. It is mentioned that throughout Oudh till Bihar, there was a presence of large numbers of Rajput Taluqdars and they played an important role in 1857 in the region.

Types of Taluqdars
(1) A hereditary owner of one or more Taluqas (land-tax jurisdictions) or an imperial tax collector with administrative power over a district of several villages in Punjab, Rajasthan, East Bengal (presently Bangladesh), and rest of North India/United Provinces. These kinds of Taluqdars were manorial, and often had both forts and military forces of their own, especially in Oudh, where they were known as Barons. Before the British annexation of the Kingdom of Oudh, the larger Taluqdars of this type in the region had occupied a position which amounted to virtual independence.

(2) An official and civil servant in Hyderabad State during the British colonial era, equivalent to a magistrate and tax collector.

(3) A landholder with peculiar tenures in various other parts of British India.

(4) Independent rulers of smaller states who exercised sovereign authority over their subjects despite being surrounded by princes. They were a few hundred in number, with hundreds of thousands of people under their jurisdiction. Such Taluqdars were autocrats and said to be the heads of despotic states.

Taluqdaris
The district or estate ruled by a Taluqdar was known as talukdari or taluqdari. According to the Punjab settlement report of 1862, great land holders were appointed Taluqdars over a number of villages during the Mughal era. That Taluq or district usually comprised over 84 villages and a central town. The Talukdar was required to collect taxes, maintain law and order, and provide military supplies/manpower to the provincial government (similar to the role of feudal lords in Europe). In most cases the Talukdars were entitled to keep one tenth of the collected revenue. However, some privileged Talukdars were entitled to one quarter and hence were called Chaudhry, which literally means owner of the fourth part.

In Rajasthan, Kathiawar and Bengal, a talukdar was next only to a raja in extent of land control and social status; but in Punjab and the United Provinces talukdars were much more powerful and were directly under the provincial governor. The late Mughal era saw the rise of powerful talukdars in Oudh, northern India, such as Balrampur,  Nanpara, Bhadri, Arkha, Itaunja, Kohra who seldom paid any collected revenue to the central government and became virtual rulers of their districts. Dr. Raja Rai Rajeshwar Bali was the President of the Taluqdar Association of Oudh. During a British parliamentary debate in 1858, Sir C. Wood brought to light the fact that Taluqdar oppression in Oudh was carried to an unthinkable extent. He mentioned that they had been taking over the lands of the remaining Rajas all over Oudh. Colonel Sleernan recalled the following act of war by a Taluqdar against a Raja: They plundered the town of Boondee, and pulled down all the houses of the rajah and those of his relatives and dependents, and after plundering all the other villages, brought in 1,000 captives of both sexes and all ages, who were subjected to all manner of torture till they paid.

Similarly, in northern Punjab, the talukdars of Dhanni, Gheb and Kot were extremely powerful.

Eighteenth century Bengal witnessed the rise of great territorial landholders at the expense of smaller landholders who were reduced to the status of dependent taluqdars, required to pay their revenue to the government through the intermediary of the great landlords called Rais, Ranas, Rajas and Maharajas. However many old taluqdars paid revenues to the government directly like Raja Jung Bahadur of Nanpara Estate and were as powerful as the Rajas. Some taluqdars like Thakur Ameer Haider Zaidi of estate Bahuwa,Thakur Ghulam Haider of estate Bahuwa, Chowdhury Ali Akhtar of Bilwa, Ramzan Ali Khan of Unnao, Raja Azam Ali Khan of Deogaon, and Thakur Roshan Zama Khan of Usmanpur were very close to the government and played an important role in tax collection in region of Awadh.

Hyderabad State
During the rule of the Nizams in Hyderabad State the top of the administrator / tax revenue collector hierarchy was the Subedar, who had responsibility for the largest divisions of the country, i.e. the Princely State of Hyderabad, of which there were five. Below this rank, the official title of the lower division (i.e. subdivisions of the five above) post holder was Tehsildar and below that the rank of Taluqdar, so in effect it could be equated to the three-tier ranking from province administrator to county administrator to district administrator in size from the largest to smallest. These are further divided into villages, under a village officer.

Today, the names Talukdar and Choudhry (with variations in spelling) are common in India and in Indians settled overseas among the descendants of those who held this rank or role in times past.

See also 

 Examples of feudalism
 Feudalism in India
 Feudalism in Pakistan
 Tribe
 Zamindar
 Ghatwals and Mulraiyats
 Lord
 Taluqa
 Tehsil
 Tehsildar
 Chaudhary

Notes

References

Titles in India
Medieval India
Government of British India
Indian feudalism
Feudalism in Pakistan
Feudalism in Bangladesh
Titles in Bangladesh
Bengali Muslim surnames